John Le Masurier (July 24, 1917 – August 31, 2014) was a British athletics coach who was best known for coaching three-time Olympic medalist Mary Rand who he connected with in 1958. He also coached sprinter Dave Segal, Chris Carter and Diane Leather, who earlier had become the first woman to break five minutes for the mile. Le Masurier was also coach of the Great Britain team at the Olympic Games between 1960 and 1976.

Le Masurier was born in Guernsey. In 2010, he was inducted into the England Athletics Hall of Fame.

He served with the Royal Marines during World War II.

References

External links
Breaking 2 minutes
Royal Marine Officers 1939−1945

1917 births
2014 deaths
Royal Marines officers
Royal Marines personnel of World War II
British athletics coaches